Everything is the third studio album by New Zealand music producer P-Money. It was released on 3 May 2010 in New Zealand and on 18 June 2010 in Australia on Central Station. Production was handled entirely by P-Money, who also served as executive producer together with Callum August. It features guest appearances from Vince Harder, Con Psy, PNC, Scribe, Aaradhna, Meryl Cassie, Mz J, and Milan Borich of Pluto.

The album peaked at number 25 on the NZ Official Top 40 Albums, and was nominated for 'Best Electronica Album' at the 2010 New Zealand Music Awards. It was supported by a hit single "Everything", which peaked at number one in New Zealand and was nominated for 'Single of the Year' at the 2009 New Zealand Music Awards.

Track listing

Notes
"Falling Down" is based on samples from "Silently Falling" by Chris Squire on his 1975 album Fish Out of Water

Charts

References

2010 albums
P-Money albums
Albums produced by P-Money